Pedro Lastra  (born 3 March 1932) is a Chilean poet and essayist.

Lastra is a graduate of the University of Chile.  Pedro Lastra first came to the U.S. as a visiting professor at SUNY Buffalo in the sixties after judging a short story competition in Cuba as part of his growing resume. There he would meet Julio Rodríguez-Puértolas, Universidad Autónoma de Madrid, emeritus, and Alan Francis, retired DOE/NYC, who later earned his doctorate from Harvard (1976), but who always mentions Pedro as an important influence in his career as Hispanist and jazz musician. They both were on the faculty of Stony Brook University during the seventies and performed jazz and poetry there. From 1966-73, he was the literary advisor to the University Press and director of the Letras de América collection.  In 1972, he moved to the United States and taught at Stony Brook University in the Department of Hispanic Languages and Literature.  In 1994, he became an emeritus professor there.

Lastra's works have been translated into English (by Elias Rivers) and into Greek. Juan Maria Solare put music to eleven of his poems.

Bibliography

Poetry
Traslado a la mañana (1959)
Y éramos inmortales (1969, 1974)
Cuaderno de la doble vida (1984)
Diario de viaje y otros poemas (1998)
Canción del pasajero (2001)
Palabras de amor (2002).

Prose
Conversaciones con Enrique Lihn (1980, 1990)
Relecturas hispanoamericanas (1987)
Invitación a la lectura (2001)
Leido y anotado: Letras chilenas e hispanoamercianas (2002).

References
 Biography, University of Iowa Libraries, Special Collections Department

1932 births
Living people
Chilean male poets
People from Quillota
Stony Brook University faculty
20th-century Chilean poets
20th-century Chilean male writers
21st-century Chilean poets
21st-century Chilean male writers